This is the filmography of actress Jacqueline Scott (January 1, 1932 – July 23, 2020). She appeared in over 100 feature films, television series, and on the Broadway stage between 1956 and 2009. She performed in Western, drama, and science fiction genres.

Film and TV appearances

1950s

1960s

1970s

1980s

1990s
1991: Equal Justice (TV Series) as Judge Naisbett
1991: Switched at Birth (TV Mini-Series) as Ruth Mays

2000s
2004: Cold Case (TV Series) as Sally Bower (2003)
2009: Sugar Boxx as Irene Guilly

References

External links
 

Actress filmographies
American filmographies